Ecgonidine (anhydroecgonine) is an alkaloid related to ecgonine and cocaine.  It has a structure with a cycloheptene ring, with a nitrogen bridge, and a carboxylic acid side chain.

Methylecgonidine is produced by pyrolysis in the process of smoking crack cocaine, and then subsequently metabolised to ecgonidine, and so these two compounds can be tested for as a specific biomarker for crack cocaine use. Ecgonidine is formed as a metabolite of methylecgonidine, and so the relative concentrations of the two compounds can be used to gauge how recently crack cocaine was smoked. If levels of methylecgonidine are higher, then the drug was smoked recently; however after a longer time period mainly ecgonidine will be present. Ecgonidine has a half-life in the body of around 94–137 minutes, and so can be used to detect use of crack cocaine up to 8–10 hours after the drug is consumed.

See also 
 Coca alkaloids
 Ecgonine
 Tropacocaine

References 

Tropane alkaloids found in Erythroxylum coca
Carboxylic acids
Cycloalkenes